In enzymology, a lactosylceramide alpha-2,6-N-sialyltransferase is an enzyme that catalyzes the chemical reaction

CMP-N-acetylneuraminate + beta-D-galactosyl-1,4-beta-D-glucosylceramide  CMP + alpha-N-acetylneuraminyl-2,6-beta-D-galactosyl-1,4-beta-D- glucosylceramide

Thus, the two substrates of this enzyme are CMP-N-acetylneuraminate and beta-D-galactosyl-1,4-beta-D-glucosylceramide, whereas its 3 products are CMP, alpha-N-acetylneuraminyl-2,6-beta-D-galactosyl-1,4-beta-D-, and glucosylceramide.

This enzyme belongs to the family of transferases, specifically those glycosyltransferases that do not transfer hexosyl or pentosyl groups.  The systematic name of this enzyme class is CMP-N-acetylneuraminate:lactosylceramide alpha-2,6-N-acetylneuraminyltransferase. Other names in common use include cytidine monophosphoacetylneuraminate-lactosylceramide, sialyltransferase, CMP-acetylneuraminate-lactosylceramide-sialyltransferase, CMP-N-acetylneuraminic acid:lactosylceramide sialyltransferase, CMP-sialic acid:lactosylceramide sialyltransferase, cytidine monophosphoacetylneuraminate-lactosylceramide, and sialyltransferase.

References

 
 

EC 2.4.99
Enzymes of unknown structure